The 1974 Angus District Council election took place on the 8 May 1974 to elect members of Angus District Council, as part of that years Scottish local elections.

Election results

References

1974 Scottish local elections
1974